The Secretary of the Central Committee of the League of Communists of Croatia was the head of the League of Communists of Croatia, heading the Central Committee of the Party. The holder of the office was, for a significant period, the de facto most influential politician in the Socialist Republic of Croatia, a constituent republic of Yugoslavia. The official name of the office was changed in May 1982 from "Secretary of the Central Committee" to President of the Presidency of the Central Committee of the League of Communists of Croatia (Predsjednik Predsjedništva Centralnog komiteta Saveza komunista Hrvatske).

The League of Communists of Croatia was also an organization subordinate to the federal-level League of Communists of Yugoslavia. Between August 1937 and September 1952, the former was named the Communist Party of Croatia (being part of the larger Communist Party of Yugoslavia), until both parties were renamed "League of Communists" in 1952.

The role was later formalized as holding ex officio positions within both the Presidency of the Socialist Republic of Croatia and the Presidency of the Central Committee of the League of Communists of Yugoslavia.

List

Here follows a list of the twelve officeholders:

See also
League of Communists of Croatia
League of Communists of Yugoslavia
Socialist Republic of Croatia
President of Croatia
List of presidents of Croatia
Prime Minister of Croatia
List of cabinets of Croatia
Speaker of the Croatian Parliament
List of heads of state of Yugoslavia
Prime Minister of Yugoslavia
Politics of Croatia

References

Communism in Croatia
League of Communists of Croatia politicians